Nayax Ltd. is a global fintech company which sells cashless, telemetry, management, monitoring and business intelligence (BI) products for the vending and unattended retail industries.

Nayax's main products are point of sale (POS) devices that accept swipe, contact or contactless payment methods, via credit/debit/closed loop or prepaid cards, mobile apps, QR scans.

History
In April 2014, Nayax purchased InOne Technologies LLC, based in Maryland, currently operating as the US subsidiary of Nayax Ltd., now known as Nayax LLC. In July 2016, Nayax acquired VendSys In August 2016, Nayax's product VPOS was awarded Best Payment System in the UK 2016 Vendies by Vending International.  In December 2016, SafeCharge International Group Ltd. (LON:SCH) completed a minority investment in Nayax.

In 2015, Nayax shipped 43,000 POS Terminals, ranking 36 in The Nilson Report's 2016 yearly survey.

References

Financial technology companies
American companies established in 2005